The Book of Invasions: A Celtic Symphony is the sixth album by the Irish Celtic rock band Horslips. It was a concept album based on an adaptation of Irish legends built into a complex story. It is named for the Lebor Gabála Érenn, a book of Irish mythology known as The Book of Invasions in English. Released in 1976, it is usually considered their best work. It was their only UK top-40 album, peaking at #39. "Trouble (With a Capital T)", "Warm Sweet Breath of Love" and "The Power and the Glory" were released as singles.

The 30th anniversary of this album was celebrated at a small gathering in Dublin organised by Horslips fans and was attended by some band members.

Track listing
The album is divided into three movements: "Geantraí" (tracks 1–8), "Goltraí" (tracks 9–11) and "Suantraí" (tracks 12–14).

Side one
 "Daybreak" (instrumental) – 2:30
 "March Into Trouble" (instrumental) – 0:51
 "Trouble (With a Capital T)" – 3:24
 "The Power and the Glory" – 3:56
 "The Rocks Remain" – 2:49
 "Dusk" (instrumental) – 0:37
 "Sword of Light" – 4:55
 "Dark" (instrumental) – 1:37
Side two
 "Warm Sweet Breath of Love" – 3:26
 "Fantasia (My Lagan Love)" (instrumental) – 2:55
 "King of Morning, Queen of Day" – 4:32
 "Sideways to the Sun" – 4:47
 "Drive the Cold Winter Away" (instrumental) – 0:35
 "Ride to Hell" – 4:07
Expanded CD with bonus tracks
"Daybreak/Drive the Cold Winter Away/Ride to Hell/Sideways to the Sun/Sword of Light" – 18:04
 "The Rights of Man" – 3:56
 "Trouble (With a Capital T)" – 3:20

Personnel

Musicians
Charles O'Connor - fiddle, mandolin, concertina, vocals, cover design
Jim Lockhart - keyboards, flute, whistles
John Fean - guitar, vocals
Barry Devlin - bass, vocals
Eamon Carr - drums, percussion

Technical
Alan O'Duffy - producer, engineer
Robbie McGrath - assistant engineer
Ian Finlay - photography
Eric G. Bannister - art direction
Evelyn Lunney - make-up

External links
http://www.horslips.ie/celtric.html
https://web.archive.org/web/20070929141843/http://www.tuatha.org/horslips/symphony.html

Horslips albums
1976 albums
DJM Records albums